Santa Rosa is a remote rural village in the Department of Santa Cruz, Bolivia. It lies to the North of the Santa Cruz/Cochabamba highway  and on the Southern border of the Amboro National Park.

Overview
It has one shop and a Roman Catholic church. None of the streets are paved.  There are no mains services of any description. Communication with the outside world is by a solar powered radio transmitter. The access road is unpaved and subject to avalanche and flooding.

Photo gallery
The photo gallery gives a good idea of the typical rural village in the foothills of the Andes in Bolivia:

Populated places in Santa Cruz Department (Bolivia)